Washington Education Center is a former vocational school in the Pittsburgh neighborhood of Lawrenceville at 40th Street and Eden Way.

Washington Polytechnic Academy was located on the former site of Washington Elementary School, which had a history spanning from 1868 until 1935. Originally named Washington Number One, the school was named in honor of George Washington's crossing of the Allegheny River with Christopher Gist. A marker on the school notes the event.  A structure was constructed on the site in 1908 and in 1936 was expanded to form the Washington Trade School. The Charles W. Bier designed structure opened on September 1, 1937. From 1937 until the early 21st century it served as a public vocational school capable of accommodating 900 students and included a testing laboratory, bricklaying shop, print shop, library, two drafting rooms, blue print shop, mimeograph room, and an auditorium with a seating capacity of 384.

On February 2, 1972 Julie Nixon Eisenhower visited the school during her fathers re-election campaign to discuss busing. In May 1972, an international contingent of students visited the center from Brazil, Thailand, South Korea, Venezuela, Chile, Peru, Afghanistan, and Libya.

The school building was listed on the National Register of Historic Places in 1986. The building was used as a school until 2006 and later sold with plans to be converted to a hotel. It opened in 2019 as the TRYP by Wyndham Pittsburgh/Lawrenceville, with 108 guest rooms and two restaurants.

References

External links

Historic Image collection

Educational institutions established in 1937
High schools in Pittsburgh
Public high schools in Pennsylvania
Magnet schools in Pennsylvania
1937 establishments in Pennsylvania
School buildings on the National Register of Historic Places in Pennsylvania
Pittsburgh History & Landmarks Foundation Historic Landmarks
National Register of Historic Places in Pittsburgh
Lawrenceville (Pittsburgh)